Lance Vaiben Solomon (27 January 1913 – 1989) was an Australian painter, noted for his landscapes. He won the prestigious Wynne Prize on two occasions.

History
Lance was born in Liverpool, New South Wales, a son of Edwin Arthur Vaiben Solomon (20 September 1877 – ), a cabinetmaker, and his wife Jessie Elizabeth Solomon, née Black (1874 – 13 May 1951). Vaiben Solomon (1802–1860) an emancipist transported in 1818 was a grandfather. He studied at the East Sydney Technical College and the Royal Academy School in London.

He married and moved to Narrabeen, New South Wales.

Recognition
He won a New South Wales travelling scholarship in 1939
He presented one of his works to HM the Queen Mother during her visit to Australia in 1958
He won the Wynne Prize 1946 for January Weather, 1953 for The River Bend
Royal Agricultural Society Easter Show 1961, 1962 and 1965

His work is shown in the National Gallery of Australia, Canberra and several State galleries.

Bibliography
Jennings, Eddi and Benkendorff, Robin. A Tribute to Lance Vaiben Solomon (1913–1989). ill. SOLOMON, Lance Vaiben. Kenthurst, Sydney: Dekiki, 1990.  Includes a Foreword by Sir William Dargie and Biographical Notes, inc. many references to Norman Lindsay, who was a sincere friend of Solomon.

Sources
McCulloch, Alan Encyclopedia of Australian Art Hutchinson of London 1968

References

External links 
National Art Gallery collection search
Lance Vaiben in Art Gallery of NSW

Australian landscape painters
1913 births
1989 deaths